Thomas Hitchcock Jr. (February 11, 1900 – April 18, 1944) was an American polo player and aviator who was killed in an air crash during World War II. He was inducted posthumously into the Polo Hall of Fame.

Early years
Born in Aiken, South Carolina, Hitchcock learned the sport of polo from his parents, Louise and Thomas Hitchcock Sr. His father was a U.S. Racing Hall of Fame horse trainer who had been a 10-goal polo player and helped found the Meadowbrook Polo Club on Long Island, New York, and who captained the American team in the inaugural 1886 International Polo Cup. Hitchcock played in his first tournament at age 13 and was part of the Meadowbrook Polo Club team that won the 1916 U.S. national junior championship.

Hitchcock attended St. Paul's School, where he played football, hockey and was a member of the crew team. After being elected president of the Sixth Form, Hitchcock chose to leave school and join the Lafayette Flying Corps in France during World War I. He was shot down and captured by the Germans, but he escaped by jumping out of a train. He then hid in the woods during the daytime and walked more than one hundred miles over eight nights to the safety of Switzerland. After the war, Hitchcock studied at Harvard University and Oxford University.

Polo career
Hitchcock led the U.S. team to victory in the 1921 International Polo Cup. From 1922 to 1940, Hitchcock carried a 10-goal handicap, which is the highest ranking in polo, from the United States Polo Association. Playing with notable stars such as Pete Bostwick, Jock Whitney and Gerald Balding, he led teams to U.S. National Open Championships in 1923, 1927, 1935 and 1936.

Marriage and later life
On December 15, 1928, Hitchcock married Margaret Lederle "Peggy" Mellon (1901–1998), the younger daughter of businessman William Larimer Mellon, in New York City. They had four children together – daughters Louise Eustis Hitchcock and Margaret Mellon Hitchcock, and twin sons Thomas Hitchcock III and William Mellon Hitchcock.

For several years, Hitchcock was employed in New York by venture capitalist and socialite George Gordon Moore. He also coached a notable polo team (including W. Averell Harriman), known as the San Carlos Cardinals, at Moore's Rancho San Carlos (now the Santa Lucia Preserve) in Carmel, California. In 1937, with fellow polo player Robert Lehman, Hitchcock became a partner in the Lehman Brothers investment firm.

Serving as a lieutenant colonel in the United States Army Air Forces during World War II, Hitchcock was assigned as an assistant air attaché to the U.S. Embassy in London, England. In that capacity, he was instrumental in the development of the P-51 Mustang fighter plane, particularly in replacing the original Allison engine with the Packard-built Rolls-Royce Merlin. Hitchcock was killed while piloting one such aircraft near Salisbury in Wiltshire, when he was unable to pull out of a dive while doing tests. His death was reported to his family by fellow St. Paul's alumnus John G. Winant, then serving as United States Ambassador to the United Kingdom.

Legacy
Author F. Scott Fitzgerald modeled two characters in his books on Hitchcock – Tom Buchanan in The Great Gatsby (1925) and the Tommy Barban character in Tender Is the Night (1934).

Following its formation, Hitchcock was inducted posthumously into the Polo Hall of Fame in 1990. He had played on teams that won the International Polo Cup several times during the 1920s and 1930s (see Big Four).

Three of Hitchcock's children – Margaret, Thomas and William – loaned the Hitchcock Estate in Millbrook, New York, to Timothy Leary from 1963 to 1968, and it became a nexus of the psychedelic movement of that decade.

References

Further reading
 Aldrich, Nelson W., Jr. Tommy Hitchcock: An American Hero (1985) Fleet Street Publishing Corp. 
</ref>

External links

 
 

1900 births
1944 deaths
American polo players
French military personnel of World War I
United States Army Air Forces colonels
Harvard University alumni
Lafayette Escadrille
People from Aiken, South Carolina
Polo players at the 1924 Summer Olympics
Olympic polo players of the United States
Olympic silver medalists for the United States
Aviators killed in aviation accidents or incidents in England
Medalists at the 1924 Summer Olympics
United States Army Air Forces personnel killed in World War II
Victims of aviation accidents or incidents in 1944
Eustis family
Olympic medalists in polo